The 1969 Giro d'Italia was the 52nd edition of the Giro d'Italia, one of cycling's Grand Tours. The field consisted of 130 riders, and 81 riders finished the race.

By rider

By nationality

References

1969 Giro d'Italia
1969